Haedropleura miocaenica is an extinct species of sea snail, a marine gastropod mollusk in the family Horaiclavidae.
This species may actually belong to Anacithara 
This species may actually belong to Anacithara

Description

Distribution

References

 Boettger, O. (1906) Zur Kenntnis der Fauna der Mittelmiocänen Schichten von Kostej im Krass- Szörénver Komitat. (Gasteropoden und Anneliden). Verhandlungen und Mitteilungen des Siebenbürgischen Vereins für Naturwissenschaften zu Hermannstadt, 54/55, 1–244

External links
 Landau B., da Silva C.M. & Vermeij G.J. (2015). First record of buccinid genus Chauvetia (Mollusca: Gastropoda) from the fossil record of the New World (Miocene, Venezuela) and its paleobiogeographic implications. Journal of Paleontology. 89(3): 487–493

miocaenica